Ndumiso Mabena (born 19 May 1987) is a South African soccer player who plays as a forward most recently for South African Premier Division side Orlando Pirates.

Club career
After playing for Winners Park in the National First Division, Mabena joined Orlando Pirates in 2009 and has since played for Platinum Stars and Bloemfontein Celtic. In summer 2021, Celtic's top-flight status was purchased by Royal AM, with Royal AM inheiring almost all of Celtic's first-team squad, including Mabena.

References

Living people
1987 births
People from Groblersdal
South African soccer players
Winners Park F.C. players
Orlando Pirates F.C. players
Platinum Stars F.C. players
Bloemfontein Celtic F.C. players
South African Premier Division players
National First Division players
Sportspeople from Limpopo
Association football forwards
20th-century South African people
21st-century South African people